Rowan Peacock (born 31 October 1939) is a South African former cyclist. He competed in the team pursuit at the 1960 Summer Olympics.

References

External links
 

1939 births
Living people
South African male cyclists
Olympic cyclists of South Africa
Cyclists at the 1960 Summer Olympics
Sportspeople from Cape Town